L'Alqueria de la Comtessa is a municipality in the comarca of Safor in the Valencian Community, Spain.
Traditionally based on agriculture, the cultivated area occupies most of the communal lands. In the dry part, there are olive trees and carob trees. In the irrigated part, which occupies a more important place, the cultivation of oranges is dominant.

References

Alqueria de la Comtessa, L'
Alqueria de la Comtessa, L'